The 1999 European Road Championships were held in Lisbon, Portugal, in August 1999. Regulated by the European Cycling Union. The event consisted of a road race and time trial for under-23 women and under-23 men.

Events summary

Medal table

References

External links
The European Cycling Union

European Road Championships, 1999
European Road Championships by year
International cycle races hosted by Portugal
1999 in Portuguese sport
Sports competitions in Lisbon
August 1999 sports events in Europe
1990s in Lisbon